Yury Anisimov (21 March 1938 – 15 December 2012) was a Soviet sailor. He competed in the Dragon event at the 1968 Summer Olympics.

References

External links
 

1938 births
2012 deaths
Soviet male sailors (sport)
Olympic sailors of the Soviet Union
Sailors at the 1968 Summer Olympics – Dragon
Sportspeople from Arkhangelsk